is a former Japanese competitor in synchronised swimming. She competed for Japan in the women's solo competition at the 1988 Summer Olympics.

She won two bronze medals at the 1986 World Aquatics Championships.

References

Living people
Japanese synchronized swimmers
1966 births
Sportspeople from Tokyo
Olympic synchronized swimmers of Japan
Synchronized swimmers at the 1988 Summer Olympics
World Aquatics Championships medalists in synchronised swimming
Synchronized swimmers at the 1986 World Aquatics Championships
20th-century Japanese women